Live: Intimate & Interactive is a 2007 single digital versatile disc (DVD) by the Canadian rock band The Tea Party. The live music DVD is the only official live video release, shot in the MuchMusic CHUM-City Building in Toronto, during their Intimate and Interactive performance in May 1998, coupled with a performance from 20 November 2000.

Track listing

Intimate and Interactive (1998) 
"Army Ants"
"Fire in the Head"
"Release"
"Transmission"
"Save Me"
"Winter Solstice / Sister Awake" 
"Temptation"
"Psychopomp"

Live @ Much (2000) 
"Temptation"
"The Messenger"
"Sister Awake"

References

External links 
 Official website with videos

The Tea Party video albums
2007 video albums
2007 live albums
Live video albums